Mistaken Island is an uninhabited island in the Dampier Archipelago, in the Pilbara, Western Australia.

Its area about 10 hectares. It is connected to East Mid Intercourse Island, and thence to the mainland, by a causeway/bridge.

The island is adjacent to the Dampier salt evaporation pond and has been used as a salt port by Dampier Salt since 1972. Over 3.5 million tonnes are exported annually, with the bulk of this going to industrial use.

Nearby islands
 Intercourse Island
 Haycock Island (Western Australia)
 East Lewis Island
 East Intercourse Island
 East Mid Intercourse Island
 West Mid Intercourse Island
 West Intercourse Island

References

Dampier Archipelago
Uninhabited islands of Australia